Kut Klose is an American R&B trio that formed in Atlanta, Georgia. The three female singers that made up the group were Athena Cage, Lavonn Battle and Tabitha Duncan. The girls were discovered by Keith Sweat who produced their debut album. They are best known for their hit single "I Like" from the album Surrender.

Career
In 1995, Kut Klose released their first album, Surrender. Despite releasing three singles, "Surrender," "Lovely Thang," and "I Like", the only one to make a significant impact was "I Like", which peaked at No. 8 on the US Hot R&B/Hip-Hop Songs chart and No. 34 on the Billboard Billboard Hot 100. The album peaked at No. 12 on the Billboard Top R&B/Hip-Hop Albums chart.

They collaborated with Keith Sweat on his 1996 single "Twisted", and Cage was featured on his 1996 single "Nobody". In 2007, the group performed with Sweat for his Sweat Hotel Live project.

In September 2010, a new song, "Let It Ring", was released by the trio as a buzz single via iTunes in anticipation of an untitled second album.

Chart positions

Albums

Singles

References

External links
RNB Haven
AllMusic

American contemporary R&B musical groups
American girl groups
African-American girl groups